The Czech Republic first participated at the Olympic Games as an independent nation in 1994, and has competed in every Summer Olympic Games and Winter Olympic Games since then.  Prior to the dissolution of Czechoslovakia in 1993, Czech athletes had competed at the Olympics from 1920 to 1992 as Czechoslovakia and from 1900 to 1912 as Bohemia.

Athletes from the Czech Republic have won a total of 67 medals at the Summer Games, with canoeing, athletics and shooting as the top medal-producing sports. The nation has also won 34 medals at the Winter Games, mostly in cross-country skiing, speed skating, and ultimately popular ice hockey. In terms of medal count the most decorated Czech Olympian within the post-Czechoslovak period is speed skater Martina Sáblíková (7 medals between 2010 and 2022).

The National Olympic Committee for the Czech Republic is the Czech Olympic Committee, which was founded in 1899 and recognized in its current form by the International Olympic Committee in 1993. On 1 November 2022, the Czech Republic requested to be known as Czechia at the Olympics.

Participation

Timeline of participation

Medal tables

Medals by Summer Games

Medals by Winter Games

Medals by summer sport

Medals by winter sport

List of medalists

Summer Games

Winter Games

See also
 List of flag bearers for the Czech Republic at the Olympics
 :Category:Olympic competitors for the Czech Republic
 Czech Republic at the Youth Olympics
 Czech Republic at the Paralympics
 Bohemia at the Olympics
 Czechoslovakia at the Olympics

External links
 
 
 

 
Olympics